Henry George Grey, 3rd Earl Grey  (28 December 18029 October 1894), known as Viscount Howick from 1807 until 1845, was an English statesman.

Background
Grey was the eldest son of Charles Grey, 2nd Earl Grey, who served as Prime Minister in the 1830s, by his wife The Honorable Mary Ponsonby, daughter of William Ponsonby, 1st Baron Ponsonby.

Political career
He entered parliament in 1826, under the title of Viscount Howick, as Whig member for Winchelsea, and then briefly for Higham Ferrers before settling for a northern constituency.  Northumberland in 1831 was followed by North Northumberland after the Great Reform Act 1832.  He remained in the parliaments dominated by his party and later by Lord Melbourne as Prime Minister.

On the accession of the Whigs to power in 1830, when his father became prime minister, he was made Under-Secretary of State for War and the Colonies.  This gave him responsibility for Britain's colonial possessions and laid the foundation of his intimate acquaintance with colonial questions.  He belonged at the time to the more advanced party of colonial reformers, sharing the views of Edward Gibbon Wakefield on questions of land and emigration, and resigned in 1834 from dissatisfaction that slave emancipation was made gradual instead of immediate. In 1835 he entered Lord Melbourne's cabinet as Secretary at War, and effected some valuable administrative reforms, especially by suppressing malpractices detrimental to the troops in India.  After the partial reconstruction of the ministry in 1839, he again resigned, disapproving of the more advanced views of some of his colleagues.

These repeated resignations gave him a reputation for crotchetiness, which he did not decrease by his disposition to embarrass his old colleagues by his action on free trade questions in the session of 1841.

After being returned unopposed at the first three general elections in Northern division of Northumberland, Howick was defeated at the 1841 general election. He returned to the Commons after a few months absence, when he was elected for the borough of Sunderland at by-election in September 1841.

During the exile of the Liberals from power he went still farther on the path of free trade, and anticipated Lord John Russell's declaration against the corn laws. When, on Sir Robert Peel's resignation in December 1845, Lord John Russell was called upon to form a ministry, Howick, who had become Earl Grey by the death of his father in the preceding July, refused to enter the new cabinet if Lord Palmerston were foreign secretary. He was greatly censured for perverseness, and particularly when in the following July he accepted Lord Palmerston as a colleague without remonstrance. His conduct, nevertheless, afforded Lord John Russell an escape from an embarrassing situation.

Becoming colonial secretary in 1846, he found himself everywhere confronted with arduous problems, which in the main he encountered with success. His administration formed an epoch. He was the first minister to proclaim that the colonies were to be governed for their own benefit and not for the mother countries; the first systematically to accord them self-government so far as then seemed possible; the first to introduce free trade into their relations with Great Britain and Ireland. The concession by which colonies were allowed to tax imports from the mother-country ad libitum was not his; he protested against it, but was overruled. In the West Indies he suppressed, if he could not overcome, discontent; in Ceylon he put down rebellion; in New Zealand he suspended the constitution he had himself accorded, and yielded everything into the hands of Sir George Grey. The least successful part of his administration was his treatment of the convict question at the Cape of Good Hope, which seemed an exception to his rule that the colonies were to be governed for their own benefit and in accordance with their own wishes, and subjected him to a humiliating defeat.

Frustrated that plans for a loan to relieve the Irish famine and fund emigration schemes from the area had failed Grey developed his plans for an alternative currency system to the Bank of England central bank model. It became known as a currency board and he set up the first one in cooperation with James Wilson and the Mauritian colonial government in Mauritius.

In 1848 Grey was elected to the New South Wales Legislative Council representing the City of Melbourne despite never visiting the colony; his seat was declared vacant in 1850 due to his non-attendance. This election was a protest against rule from Sydney and in 1850 Grey introduced the Australian Colonies Government Act which separated the district from New South Wales to become the colony of Victoria.

After his retirement he wrote a history and defence of his colonial policy in the form of letters to Lord John Russell (Colonial Policy of Lord John Russell's Administration, 1853). He resigned with his colleagues in  February 1852. No room was found for him in the Aberdeen ministry formed in December that year, and although during the Crimean struggle public opinion pointed to him as the fittest man as minister for war, he never again held office. During the remainder of his long life he exercised a vigilant criticism on public affairs. In 1858 he wrote a work (republished in 1864) on parliamentary reform; in 1888 he wrote another on the state of Ireland; and in 1892 one on the United States tariff. In his latter years he was a frequent contributor of weighty letters to The Times on land, tithes, currency and other public questions. His principal parliamentary appearances were when he moved for a committee on Irish affairs in 1866, and when in 1878 he passionately opposed the policy of the Beaconsfield cabinet in India. He nevertheless supported Lord Beaconsfield at the dissolution, regarding William Ewart Gladstone's accession to power with much greater alarm. He was a determined opponent of Gladstone's Home rule policy.

Family
Lord Grey married on 9 August 1832, to Maria, daughter of Sir Joseph Copley, 3rd Baronet of Sprotborough. They had no children. She died in September 1879. Lord Grey survived her by fifteen years and died on 9 October 1894, aged 91.  He was succeeded in the earldom by his nephew, Albert Grey (born 1851). The suburb of Howick in Auckland, New Zealand, is named after the earl.

References

External links 
 
image of the Earl Grey

1802 births
1894 deaths
Children of prime ministers of the United Kingdom
Earls Grey
Knights Grand Cross of the Order of St Michael and St George
Knights of the Garter
Lord-Lieutenants of Northumberland
Secretaries of State for War and the Colonies
Members of the New South Wales Legislative Council
Members of the Parliament of the United Kingdom for English constituencies
UK MPs 1826–1830
UK MPs 1830–1831
UK MPs 1832–1835
UK MPs 1835–1837
UK MPs 1837–1841
UK MPs 1841–1847
Grey, E3
Members of the Privy Council of the United Kingdom